Season seven of the television program American Experience originally aired on the PBS network in the United States on October 11, 1994 and concluded on May 9, 1995. This is the seventh season to feature David McCullough as the host. The season contained eight new episodes and began with the first two parts of the FDR film, "The Center of the World" and "Fear Itself". A new opening sequence was introduced in this season, set on a waving blue background, and featuring many stars morphing into shapes.

Episodes

 Denotes multiple chapters that aired on the same date and share the same episode number

References

1994 American television seasons
1995 American television seasons
American Experience